The French submarine Gustave Zédé was the lead boat of the class of submarines built for the French Navy during the 1910s.

During World War I, Gustave Zédé sank in the Adriatic Sea on 24 August 1916 due to an explosion in her batteries, with the loss of four of her 40 crew. She was subsequently refloated, repaired, and returned to service.

See also 
List of submarines of France

Citations

Bibliography

 

Ships built in France
1913 ships
World War I submarines of France
Maritime incidents in 1916
Ships sunk by non-combat internal explosions
World War I shipwrecks in the Adriatic Sea